Thamnomys is a genus of Old World rats from East Central Africa.

Species
Genus Thamnomys
Kemp's thicket rat - Thamnomys kempi Dollman, 1911    
Hatt's thicket rat - Thamnomys major Hatt, 1934
Charming thicket rat - Thamnomys venustus Thomas, 1907

References
Musser, G. G. and M. D. Carleton. 2005. Superfamily Muroidea. pp. 894–1531 in Mammal Species of the World a Taxonomic and Geographic Reference. D. E. Wilson and D. M. Reeder eds. Johns Hopkins University Press, Baltimore.

 
Rodent genera
Taxa named by Oldfield Thomas